Crambus hampsoni is a moth in the family Crambidae. It was described by Stanisław Błeszyński in 1961. It is endemic to Kenya.

References

Endemic moths of Kenya
Crambini
Moths described in 1961
Moths of Africa